Kenneth W. Rendell (born May 12, 1943 in Boston), is the founder of The International Museum of World War II in Boston, and an American dealer and expert in historical documents. His father, Harry, was a pharmacist, and his mother, Pauline, an art teacher. His first marriage (1967) to Diana Angelo ended in divorce (1985). Their first son, Jeffrey, was born in 1971; their second, Jason, was born in 1982 (deceased 1998). He married journalist Shirley McNerney on July 14, 1985; their adopted daughter Julia Louise was born in 1994.

Early life
In 1953 a customer in his father's drug store paid with an 1806 Liberty half-dollar, and this launched Rendell into the rare coin business. The Somerville Journal recounted how he sold the coin for $3.50, used the money to begin his business, and later bought the coin back for $4.50. "The Liberty piece now sits in a position of honor in his office and 'showroom' on the back porch of his parents' house."

Rendell later elaborated on his early success. "In those days you could get an old penny and sell it for 10 cents; you could actually make money doing that. Then I got much more sophisticated—I got the guy who did the gumball machines at the drugstore to sell me all the coins. Now we started to get this thing organized! I could sort through large quantities. I was 12." He soon branched out into the area of American colonial coinage and political memorabilia, and later wrote several reference works in this field.

Historical documents
As a teen, Rendell's interests and growing expertise led him into the world of historical documents. "Coins are nice, but they're cold compared to a letter, where you get the sense of the person," he said later. In 1988 Architectural Digest noted: "Ideally, the autograph not only records a known person's participation in a historical event, but as Kenneth Rendell says, is a 'time capsule.' It opens up the historical moment to a sense of the personal feelings involved and brings the contemporary reader right into that long-ago event."

Rendell developed his business between 1959 and 2014, establishing galleries in New York, Beverly Hills, and Tokyo. He served as an expert witness for the Internal Revenue Service in the 1973 tax court trial of former Illinois governor Otto Kerner, Jr. "The judge quoted Rendell's opinion extensively in ruling for the Internal Revenue Service."

Developing Major Collections
By the turn of the century, Rendell's reputation as a collector had made him a leading voice in a business that, due to technological innovation, was rapidly changing. "When Bill Gates wanted to start a serious, anachronistic paper library in his extreme-tech Shangri-La on the shores of Lake Washington," Wired noted in 1999, "he knew who to turn to: Kenneth W. Rendell."

The following year Rendell wrote the cover story for the September issue of Business 2.0. In "Future Shock, 25 Visions of What's Next," he asserted: "The major libraries of the future are being formed right now, and the Internet in particular and technology in general are important ingredients. These libraries are different from those of past generations because of the psychology of their creators, principally individual collectors, who happen to be leaders in technology. They don't collect to impress people, to create an image, or to reassure themselves of their erudition. They are not impressed that something is rare, or that others have deemed it desirable. They don't need to buy culture."

Forgery detection
Rendell's pioneering study Forging History, The Detection of Fake Letters & Documents [University of Oklahoma Press, 1994] was the first reference book to document, with systematic descriptions and exhaustive illustrations, the forensic examination of questioned historical documents. Robert S. Gordon, the National Archivist of Canada, stated in his review of the book: "Rendell is eminently qualified to deal with this subject. He has researched the field, written many articles, and presented numerous papers and lectures at meetings of professional groups. He developed sophisticated methodology and scientific techniques, and put them to practical use."

By 1987 Rendell had founded a course on forgery detection at Columbia University. "For a long time, dealers said things were based on 'gut instincts,' backed by a lot of intellect," he told The Miami Herald. "Now, you can prove or disprove a lot by scientific means." That included the use of ultraviolet light and microscopes in the analysis of ink, paper, and minute details of handwriting. "I've made a point of explaining my findings in a way that people can understand, so it's not just the expert 'proclaiming,'" he said. "It just isn't a guessing game."

Hitler diaries

In the spring of 1983 the West German magazine Stern published excerpts of what were purported to be Adolf Hitler's diaries, which had reportedly been found in a wrecked German transport plane. The cover story of the May 2, 1983, issue of Newsweek was: "Hitler Diaries Discovered, Are They Genuine?" Hired by the magazine as a consultant, Rendell "said he would investigate everything—from paper to ink to handwriting to bindings. He would also check into the alleged provenience of the documents." He revealed the results of his efforts in Newsweek'''s May 16, 1983, cover story, "Forgery — Uncovering The Hitler Hoax." The diaries, he asserted, were fake. That week Time noted: "On sound ground but playing an awkward role was Kenneth Rendell. Also separately advising Stern, he put the two volumes brought to New York by Koch [Peter Koch, Editor-in-Chief of Stern] under his microscope, photocopied and enlarged the words, and concluded that the books were forgeries. When he told this to Koch, Rendell says, 'he was absolutely devastated.' At week's end Rendell said that his sole interest was to pursue his theories about how 'this mess,' as he called it, had been created. He predicted 'there is potentially a twist to this whole thing.'" Hired by Stern to investigate, Rendell later published his findings in Forging History.

The Mormon Murders & Forgeries
Rendell was subsequently drawn into what would prove to be one of the most notorious fraud cases in American history. It centered on Utah native Mark Hofmann, who had forged and sold several documents related to early Mormon history. Rendell later provided a detailed overview of the case for the October 1987 issue of Art & Auction. "The Mormon bombing, forgery and fraud case is one of incredible complexity," he wrote. "As the second-most famous forgery case of the 20th-century, it has much in common with the Hitler diaries fraud, notably that aspect involving the victims in the perpetration and success of the hoax. However, the Mormon forger was vastly more skilled in the creation of the forgeries, and the results of the hoax far more devastating. With the Hitler diaries the victims lost their jobs; in the Mormon case, two people lost their lives."

Hofmann's boldest forgery was soon dubbed the "Salamander Letter." Supposedly written by Martin Harris, it recast Joseph Smith, founder of the Latter Day Saint movement, in a dark new light. "Late in 1983," Rendell wrote, "Mark Hofmann asked me to examine the Salamander Letter. As there was no known genuine handwriting of Martin Harris, I could only examine the handwriting for evidence of the usual characteristics of inconsistency found in forgeries, and verify the type of postmark and the other characteristics which would be found in a genuine letter of the period. The content could not be verified because of its controversial nature, but Hofmann's story of the history of the letter was verified and the provenance was found to be logical." Rendell discovered nothing unusual in the handwriting, and informed Hofmann that he had found nothing to indicate a forgery. "The Federal Bureau of Investigation," Rendell wrote, "issued an identical report: they found no evidence of forgery in the handwriting, and nothing inconsistent with the date, ink, and materials."

Awash in debt, Hofmann next claimed to have discovered a set of history-changing manuscripts that, he asserted, had been written by another early Mormon, William E. McLellin. "He not only sold the non-existent collection several times," Rendell wrote, "he also sold a percentage of interest in it to those who could not afford to purchase it in its entirety." The pressure on Hofmann built. Fearing exposure, "Hofmann decided to kill the main characters." On October 15, 1985, bombs built by Hofmann exploded, killing Utah collector Steven Christensen and a second victim, Kathy Sheets.

In January 1986, police investigators approached Rendell with a number of Hofmann's documents, and many questions. "Based on handwriting and other observable characteristics, every piece had indications of being a forgery," Rendell wrote. "I then discovered the bright blue fluorescence and the painted appearance of the documents, indicating that that a chemical treatment had been used to prevent the ink from feathering into the paper. Three days later, Hofmann was formally charged with the forgeries and murders." He was subsequently convicted and sentenced to five years to life in prison.

Jack the Ripper Diary

In 1993 Rendell was enlisted to test the validity of what was purported to be the diary of Jack the Ripper. He concluded that it was a forgery. On September 8, The Washington Post ran the following: "Time Warner Books Inc. yesterday canceled 'The Diary of Jack the Ripper,' exactly one month before 200,000 copies of the Victorian serial killer's supposed ramblings were to go on sale. What was once touted by the publisher as the historical find of the century collapsed into a hoax. 'It's so deadly obvious from every way you look at it. It's got too many fatal flaws,' said Kenneth Rendell, a dealer in historical documents who spearheaded an intensive last-minute investigation of the diary at the behest of the publisher after a July Washington Post story raised doubts about its authenticity. Among the many problems Rendell cited in his report: The style of the handwriting is not Victorian; the handwriting does not resemble known examples of the alleged diarist's penmanship; and the diary is written in an oversize scrapbook with the first 20 pages suspiciously missing. 'It's possible,' Rendell said, 'it was done in the '30s, and someone set it out to be found at some later date."

Nevertheless, in 1993 Hyperion Press published The Diary of Jack the Ripper, which "included Rendell's full seven-page report to Time Warner Books that it was a hoax. In a five-page rebuttal, the English publisher disagreed with all of his conclusions."

Collection of Western Americana
Another of Rendell's interests is the American West. In 2004-5 the Museum of Our National Heritage in Lexington, Massachusetts, mounted an exhibition called "The Western Pursuit of the American Dream: Selections From the Collection of Kenneth W. Rendell," comprising letters, diaries, artifacts, and art that he had acquired over decades. The Grolier Club in New York City subsequently hosted an abridged version of the exhibit, which, the club noted, "document this national adventure through the actual words and artifacts of explorers, travelers, warriors, gold seekers, merchants, outlaws—dreamers all—who shaped the American frontier." According to The New York Times the exhibit offered "a sense of the struggle to tame the gorgeous wilderness that stretched beyond the tidy civilizations of the East," and called it "worth spending time with."

In 2004 the University of Oklahoma Press published The Western Pursuit of the American Dream: Selections From the Collection of Kenneth W. Rendell, a book of some 500 illustrations that built upon the original exhibition. In 2013 Whitman Publishing released Rendell's second book devoted to Western Americana, The Great American West: Pursuing the American Dream. Centered on additional artifacts from the author's collections, the book traced the migration of settlers spurred west by "the hope that a better life awaits your initiative, your perseverance, your cleverness, your hard work."

The International Museum of World War II
In 1959 Rendell began collecting documents about World War II. Over the next 40 years this informal effort grew into an organized and serious endeavor. During the 1960s and 1970s, when there was often little interest in such material at auctions, even from government libraries and archives, he readily (and inexpensively) bought entire collections. He eventually established The International Museum of World War II in a 10,000-square-foot building near Boston, a place, declared Architectural Digest, where "More than 6,000 Artifacts Put History into Unforgettable Perspective."

In September 2009 The Boston Globe described the museum as "an evocative and jaw-dropping collection of more than 6,000 wartime artifacts Rendell has gathered over four decades," and "very much an extension of its creator and his passion for the subject, which he calls 'the biggest psychological drama of the 20th century.'" Rendell told the paper, "History is not how you wish it had been, it's the way it actually was." A subsequent Town & Country article noted, "Unlike at most museums, visitors here are allowed to touch the items, if ever so gently."

In 2009 Rendell showcased his World War II document collection with the first of two books, World War II: Saving the Reality. In her foreword Doris Kearns Goodwin wrote: "Through this unparalleled collection of original letters and artifacts, we follow the story of the war, not as historians after the fact, but by the side of the leaders and the people who lived and died during those dramatic years." In his foreword to 2013's Politics, War and Personality: Fifty Iconic World War II Documents That Changed the World, John S.D. Eisenhower wrote: "Virtual reality dominates our lives. This museum is doubly refreshing … authenticity is not only the norm, it is demanded … every item is authentic, original and real."

The museum was regularly acknowledged for its original approach and world-class content. In 2014 The New York Times reviewed an exhibit drawn from its collections, The Power of Words & Images in a World at War. Nowadays, it stated, "it is the ephemera that ends up reviving the past, jolting us into more vivid understanding. And much of what we see in this exhibition does just that. Objects of everyday life during World War II—the posters, the signs, the letters—land on contemporary senses like sparks still smoldering." The Times concluded that the exhibit "manages to give a powerful compact survey, while suggesting how much of that epochal conflict yet remains beyond easy understanding."

On April 12, 2016, "The Power of Anti-Semitism: The March to the Holocaust, 1919-1939," an exhibition developed by Rendell from the museum's collections, debuted at the New York Historical Society and ran through July 31. An 80-page companion book of the same name, written by Rendell and Samantha Heywood, was published simultaneously. The Wall Street Journal described the exhibit as "powerful," while the director of the New York Historical Society deemed it "a new—and path-breaking—understanding of the trajectory of anti-Semitism in Europe."

The museum's special exhibitions, based wholly on its own artifacts and documents, included "Most Secret: Rudolph Hess' Own Archive," "The Reality of the Resistance," "Enigma Code Machines and the Imitation Game," and "Hitler Attacks, Churchill Rises From the Ashes of Appeasement." The most recent, "The 75th Anniversary of Pearl Harbor: Why We Remember," ran from October 8, 2016, through January 7, 2017. According to a Wall Street Journal review dubbed "Making Pearl Harbor Personal," the exhibit "humanizes a larger-than-life historic event."

On October 25, 2016, National Geographic Books released The Secret History of World War II: Spies, Code Breakers, and Covert Operations, by Neil Kagan and Stephen G. Hyslop. Featuring a foreword by Kenneth Rendell, it is illustrated almost exclusively with images of artifacts that were in the museum's collections.

In 2016 the museum, which was originally known as the Museum of World War II, was renamed The International Museum of World War II to better reflect the global perspective of its exhibitions, which, the Imperial War Museum has asserted, boast "the most comprehensive display of original World War II artifacts on exhibit anywhere in the world." The museum contained some 12,500 artifacts, 500,000 photographs and documents, 3,500 posters, and 7,500 reference books. Items from its collections were frequently loaned to other museums, including the Imperial War Museum, in London, the International Spy Museum, in Washington, DC, and the CIA Museum, in Langley, VA.

In 2018 National Geographic Books published Atlas of World War II: History's Greatest Conflict Revealed Through Rare Wartime Maps and New Cartography, again by Neil Kagan and Stephen Hyslop in conjunction with Kenneth Rendell, who wrote the foreword. The 254-page, large format work drew exclusively from maps in Rendell's collection.

In 2019 it was decided that the museum's future was in Washington, D.C. Efforts to raise funds for a new, greatly expanded museum in the Boston area had been unsuccessful, and billionaire Ronald Lauder took over responsibility for the museum. Rendell and Lauder completed most of the design for the new facility with a London firm, but the Covid-19 pandemic has delayed construction.

Philanthropy
In 2000 Rendell created an endowment with the Appalachian Mountain Club (AMC) to provide for trail maintenance in the White Mountains of New Hampshire, where he and his sons frequently had hiked. The Jason J. Rendell Endowment also funds AMC activities.

Since the 1990s Rendell has been a very active supporter of Youth Enrichment Services (YES), in Boston's inner-city neighborhoods, and serves on an advisory board. In Hawaii, where Rendell maintains a home, he has likewise supported the Paia Youth Cultural Center in helping young people develop in a positive way.

Rendell was a founding supporter and on the board of the Rare Book School at Columbia University and continued his support after its move to the University of Virginia. In 2021 he and his wife Shirley McNerney endowed a lecture and publication series on the importance of original manuscripts and rare books to human understanding.

In 2021 the Grolier Club of New York, the premier organization of manuscript and rare book collectors, announced the major gift of Rendell's collection on the detection of forged handwriting, numbering over 10,000 pieces, including hundreds of original forgeries from the sixteenth century to the present day and thousands of facsimiles of genuine handwriting, reference books, and tools. It is the most comprehensive collection on the subject in the world. In the same year, Rendell and McNerney established two endowed annual lectures at the Grolier Club—the Rendell Lecture on the importance of original manuscripts in understanding the thoughts and intentions of historical persons, and the McNerney Lecture, focused on women in collecting.

The Spark Foundation
In 2018 Rendell formulized an idea to help students in the community he grew up in, Somerville, Massachusetts, next to Boston, who were excelling in school but whose economic and social constraints were limiting their potential. The Spark Foundation offers them a broad range of academic and career possibilities and the realization that their place in the world is determined by their efforts and success, not their background. They see that they belong with a wide range of other talented young people. Spark scholarship recipients regularly attend summer sessions at Barnard College, Boston University, Columbia University, Georgetown University, Harvard Medical School, Harvard Business School, Smith College, Stanford University, Tufts University, Wellesley College, Yale University, and many other colleges and universities.

Publications
 With Weapons and Wits: Propaganda and Psychological Warfare in World War II, Overlord Press, 1992.
 Forging History: The Detection of Fake Letters and Documents, University of Oklahoma Press, 1994.
 History Comes to Life: Collecting Historical Letters and Documents, University of Oklahoma Press, 1995.
 The Western Pursuit of the American Dream: Selections from the Collection of Kenneth W. Rendell, University of Oklahoma Press, 2004.
 World War II: Saving the Reality, Whitman Publishing, 2009.
 The Great American West: Pursuing the American Dream, Whitman Publishing, 2013. 
 Politics, War, and Personality: 50 Iconic Documents of World War II. Whitman Publishing, 2013.
 The Power of Anti-Semitism: The March to the Holocaust, 1919-1939, (with Samantha Heywood), Boston, 2016.

Rendell is also co-editor of two books:

 Autographs and Manuscripts: A Collector's Manual, Charles Scribner's Sons, 1978.
 Manuscripts: The First Twenty Years, Greenwood Press, 1984.

Rendell wrote the foreword for:

 The Secret History of World War II: Spies, Code Breakers, and Covert Operations, National Geographic Books, 2016.
 Atlas of World War II: History's Greatest Conflict Revealed Through Rare Wartime Maps and New Cartography'', National Geographic Books, 2018.

References

External links

Museum of World War II

1943 births
Living people
Book and manuscript collectors
American booksellers